JMS Hurry-Up is a men's handball club from Zwartemeer, Netherlands, that plays in the NHV Eredivisie.

Crest, colours, supporters

Kits

Honours 

 Dutch Cup 2010/2011

EHF Challenge Cup semi-final 2016/2017

European record

Team

Current squad 
Squad for the 2016–17 season

Goalkeepers
  Thomas Aagaard
  Wouter Greevink
  Sven Hemmes 
  Manuel Kremer 

Wingers
RW
  Tobias Marx
  Bart Mik
LW 
  Thies Berendsen
  Tommie Falke
Line players 
  Almir Balas
  Sjoerd Boonstra
  Rick Hollander

Back players
LB
  Tomas Bernatavicius  
  Ruben Fiege
  Loek Hageman
  Joel Heusmann
  Aron Kieviet  
CB 
  Vaidas Trainavicius
RB
  Ronald Suelmann
  Dimitrios Katsikis

External links
Official website 

Dutch handball clubs 
Sports clubs in Emmen, Netherlands